Cumbia Ninja is the soundtrack album to the eponymous series. The soundtrack was released on October 15, 2013 by Sony Music.

Background

Production 
The album was recorded during the filming of the first season of the television series. The lead single was "Ojos en la espalda" released on July 8, 2013 with their official video, and subsequently published other singles from the album.

Released 

Released in Latin America on October 8, 2013, in Italy on October 12, 2013 with 16 track. The album is available in record stores throughout Latin America and through iTunes, Deezer and Spotify in Mexico and Argentina.

The album is composed of 14 songs plus 3 additional versions performed by Ricardo Abarca and Brenda Asnicar, the lyrics of the songs on the album were written by Andres Gelos, screenwriter Cumbia Ninja and feature produced by Puerto Rican Master Chris.

Track listing

Latin American edition

References 

2013 soundtrack albums
Television soundtracks